Lake Tashk is a salt lake in Fars Province, southern Iran, about  east of Shiraz and  west of the town of Abadeh Tashk.

References

External links

Lakes of Iran
Landforms of Fars Province
Saline lakes of Asia